The City Municipality of Koper is one of twelve city municipalities of Slovenia. It lies at the coastline of the Adriatic Sea in southwestern Slovenia and was established in 1994. Its seat is the town of Koper. The area has been included in Coastal–Karst Statistical Region since 1995. The municipality is bilingual (Slovene and Italian).

Settlements

In addition to the municipal seat of Koper, the municipality also includes the following settlements:

 Abitanti
 Babiči
 Barizoni
 Belvedur
 Bertoki
 Bezovica
 Bočaji
 Bonini
 Boršt
 Bošamarin
 Brezovica pri Gradinu
 Brežec pri Podgorju
 Brič
 Butari
 Čentur
 Cepki
 Cerej
 Čežarji
 Črni Kal
 Črnotiče
 Dekani
 Dilici
 Dol pri Hrastovljah
 Dvori
 Elerji
 Fijeroga
 Gabrovica pri Črnem Kalu
 Galantiči
 Gažon
 Glem
 Gračišče
 Gradin
 Grinjan
 Grintovec
 Hrastovlje
 Hrvatini
 Kampel
 Karli
 Kastelec
 Kolomban
 Koromači–Boškini
 Kortine
 Kozloviči
 Koštabona
 Krkavče
 Krnica
 Kubed
 Labor
 Loka
 Lopar
 Lukini
 Manžan
 Marezige
 Maršiči
 Močunigi
 Montinjan
 Movraž
 Olika
 Osp
 Peraji
 Pisari
 Plavje
 Pobegi
 Podgorje
 Podpeč
 Poletiči
 Pomjan
 Popetre
 Prade
 Praproče
 Predloka
 Pregara
 Premančan
 Puče
 Rakitovec
 Rižana
 Rožar
 Šalara
 Šeki
 Sirči
 Škocjan
 Šmarje
 Smokvica
 Socerb
 Sočerga
 Sokoliči
 Spodnje Škofije
 Srgaši
 Stepani
 Sveti Anton
 Tinjan
 Topolovec
 Trebeše
 Triban
 Trsek
 Truške
 Tuljaki
 Vanganel
 Zabavlje
 Zanigrad
 Zazid
 Zgornje Škofije
 Župančiči

References

External links

City Municipality of Koper at Geopedia
Official site

 
Koper
1994 establishments in Slovenia